Poems and Ballads, First Series is the first collection of poems by Algernon Charles Swinburne, published in 1866. The book was instantly popular, and equally controversial. Swinburne wrote about many taboo topics, such as lesbianism, sado-masochism, and anti-theism. The poems have many common elements, such as the Ocean, Time, and Death. Several historical persons are mentioned in the poems, such as Sappho, Anactoria, Jesus (Galilaee, La. "Galilean") and Catullus.

Poems 

A Ballad of Life
A Ballad of Death
Laus Veneris
Phædra
The Triumph of Time
Les Noyades
A Leave-Taking
Itylus
Anactoria
Hymn to Proserpine
Ilicet
Hermaphroditus
Fragoletta
Rondel
Satia te Sanguine
A Litany
A Lamentation
Anima Anceps
In the Orchard
A Match
Faustine
A Cameo
Song before Death
Rococo
Stage Love
The Leper
A Ballad of Burdens
Rondel
Before the Mirror
Erotion
In Memory of Walter Savage Landor
A Song in Time of Order. 1852
A Song in Time of Revolution. 1860
To Victor Hugo
Before Dawn
Dolores
The Garden of Proserpine
Hesperia
Love at Sea
April
Before Parting
The Sundew
Félise
An Interlude
Hendecasyllabics
Sapphics
At Eleusis
August
A Christmas Carol
The Masque of Queen Bersabe
St. Dorothy
The Two Dreams
Aholibah
Love and Sleep
Madonna Mia
The King's Daughter
After Death
May Janet
The Bloody Son
The Sea-Swallows
The Year of Love
Dedication

Influences 

Swinburne dedicated Poems and Ballads to fellow Pre-Raphaelite, Edward Burne-Jones. Burne-Jones' painting Laus Veneris, first exhibited in 1878, shared the story of Tannhäuser as its inspiration with Swinburne's poem of the same name.

The Borghese Hermaphroditus at the Louvre inspired Swinburne's poem "Hermaphroditus", subscribed "Au Musée du Louvre, Mars 1863".
The Isle of Wight, to the south of the British coast, was Swinburne's home throughout his childhood and later life; his love for the sea appears often in his poetry, where it is a metaphor for time, as in "Love at Sea", written in imitation of Théophile Gautier, and "The Triumph of Time".
The first documented use of the word "lesbianism" to refer to female homosexuality is in 1870, four years after Swinburne published this book, which includes the poem "Sapphics", where he refers to Sappho of Lesbos and her lover Anactoria as "Lesbians". Although use of the term lesbian in this way was present as early as 1732, "sapphic" or "tribade" were more commonly used until the late 19th century, when Swinburne was among the first to popularize the term lesbian.

Second and Third Series

In 1878 Swinburne published a collection of poems titled Poems and Ballads, Second Series, which is less political, and also shows the influence of French literature. It includes verses to Baudelaire, Gautier, Villon, Hugo, and Théodore de Banville. It also contains his translations of Villon.

In 1889, Swinburne published a collection of poems titled Poems and Ballads, Third Series, which contains "To a Seamew", "Pan and Thalassius", "Neap-Tide", elegies for Sir Henry Taylor and John William Inchbold, and border ballads, that were written for an unfinished novel, Lesbia Brandon.

References

External links
 Poems and Ballads at Internet Archive

19th-century poems
1866 books
1866 in England
LGBT poetry
BDSM literature
LGBT literature in the United Kingdom
Cultural depictions of Sappho
Works by Algernon Charles Swinburne